The Alberta Rugby League (or the ARLC) is a domestic rugby league football competition in Alberta, Canada operated by the Canada Rugby League.

Clubs

Representative Squad

See also

British Columbia Rugby League
Ontario Rugby League
Rugby league in Canada

References

External links
Official Facebook

Rugby league competitions in Canada
Sports leagues in Alberta
Sports leagues established in 2010
2010 establishments in Alberta